Ptolemy is a name derived from Ancient Greek.  Common variants include Ptolemaeus (Latin), Tolomeo (Italian) and Talmai (Hebrew).

Etymology
Ptolemy is the English form of the Ancient Greek name Πτολεμαῖος (Ptolemaios), a derivative of πτόλεμος, an Epic form of πόλεμος 'war'. A nephew of Antigonus I Monophthalmus was called Polemaeus, the normal form of the adjective. Ptolemaios is first attested in Homer's Iliad and is the name of an Achaean warrior, son of Piraeus, father of Eurymedon.

The name Ptolemaios varied over the years from its roots in ancient Greece, appearing in different languages in various forms and spellings: 

 
 
 
 
 
  
 Phoenician: 𐤐𐤕𐤋𐤌𐤉𐤎 (ptlmyš) or 𐤐𐤕𐤋𐤌𐤉𐤔 (ptlmys)
 Hebrew and Aramaic: תלמי Talmai
 Middle Persian 𐭯𐭲𐭫𐭬𐭥𐭱 (ptlmywš) Patlamyōš
  Baṭlamīūs/ Ptolemaios
  Baṭulīmūs
The name Ptolemy spread from its Greek origins to enter other languages in Western Asia during the Hellenisation that followed the conquest of the known world by Alexander the Great.
  
The Aramaic name Bar Talmai (Greek Bartolomaios and English Bartholomew) may be related.

Ptolemais is formed from this name by the Greek feminine adjectival ending -i(d)s.

Claudius Ptolemaeus
Ptolemy commonly refers to Claudius Ptolemaeus (ca. 90 AD–ca. 168 AD), a writer, geographer, mathematician, astronomer and astrologer who lived in the Alexandrine Greek culture of Roman Egypt.

Early Greek rulers and generals named Ptolemy
Ptolemy (King of Thebes) (12th century BC) – mythical ruler of the ancient Greek city of Thebes
Ptolemy of Aloros (ruled 368 to 365 BC) – Regent of Macedon
Ptolemy (somatophylax) (died 334 BC) – Macedonian bodyguard and general of Alexander the Great
Ptolemy (son of Seleucus) (died 333 BC) – Macedonian bodyguard and general of Alexander the Great
Ptolemy (son of Philip) (4th century BC) –  Macedonian officer of Alexander the Great
Ptolemy (general) or Polemaios (died 309 BC) – Macedonian general and nephew of Antigonus I Monophthalmus
Ptolemy (son of Pyrrhus) (295–272 BC) – a son of king Pyrrhus of Epirus
Ptolemy of Epirus – King of the Greek frontier kingdom of Epirus c. 237 BC – 234 ВС

Egyptian Ptolemaic dynasty

The Ptolemaic dynasty, of Macedonian origin, ruled Hellenistic Egypt for nearly 300 years, from 305 BC to 30 BC. The kings of this dynasty, the first of which was Ptolemy I Soter (303–282 BC), were all named Ptolemy, as were several other members of the dynasty.

Other people named Ptolemy or Ptolemaeus

Born before 20th century
Ptolemy Macron (fl. 2nd century BC), governor of Coele-Syria and Phoenicia.
Ptolemaeus of Commagene (201 BC - 130 BC), satrap and then first King of Commagene
Ptolemy (son of Abubus), governor of Jericho (ca. 130 BC) in the First Book of the Maccabees; instigated the death of Simon Maccabees; and for whom Dante named the section of Hell reserved for traitors to guests ('Ptolemaea')
Ptolemy (son of Mennaeus) (rule ended ca. 40 BC), governor of biblical Abilene, a district of the disputed region of Coele-Syria
Ptolemy of Mauretania (d.40 AD)
Ptolemaeus Chennus (2nd century AD), a grammarian who lived in the Alexandrine Greek culture of Roman Egypt
Ptolemaeus and Lucius (d. c. 165 AD), Christian martyrs
Ptolemy (gnostic) (c. 180 AD), a religious philosopher who was active in Roman Italy and Gaul
Ptolemy-el-Garib (fl. c. 300 AD), a Peripatetic pinacographer whose Life of Aristotle 
 Ptolemaeus Secundus ('Second Ptolemy'), a nickname for the Arab polymath Ibn al-Haytham (c. 965 – c. 1040)
Ptolemy I of Tusculum (d.1126), a count of Tusculum who asserted his family's descent from the Roman Julii
Ptolemy II of Tusculum (d.1153), a count of Tusculum who married Bertha, daughter of Henry V, Holy Roman Emperor
Ptolemaios Sarigiannis (1882–1958), a Greek Army officer

Born in 20th century or later
Ptolemy Tompkins (born 1962) – American author
Ptolemy Dean (born 1968) – British architect, author, and TV presenter
Ptolemy Slocum (born 1975) – American actor
Barry Ptolemy (born 1969) – American film director and producer

People named Tolomeo or Tolomei
Tolomeo da Lucca or Bartholomew of Lucca (Bartolomeo Fiadoni c. 1236 – c. 1327), a medieval Italian historian
Bernard Tolomeo (1272–1348), founder of the Olivetan Roman 
Tolomeo Gallio (1527–1607), an Italian cardinal
Tolomeo Faccendi (1905–1970), an Italian sculptor
Tolomeo Mwansa (1941-2014), a Zambian football goalkeeper 
Giovanni Battista Tolomei (1653–1726), Italian Jesuit priest, theologian, and cardinal

Uses in arts and entertainment
The Ptolemy (1934) is a large reed organ built by the American composer Harry Partch,  named in tribute to Claudius Ptolemaeus
Tolomeo is an opera by Handel composed in 1728, a fictionalisation of some events in the life of Ptolemy IX Lathyros, king of Egypt
Alderman Ptolemy Tortoise is a character in The Tale of Mr. Jeremy Fisher by Beatrix Potter
Ptolemaios and Ptolemaios 2 are fictional spacecraft in the anime television series Mobile Suit Gundam 00 and film Mobile Suit Gundam 00 the Movie: A Wakening of the Trailblazer
Ptolemy's Gate, published 2005, is the third book in The Bartimaeus Trilogy, a fantasy series by the English author Jonathan Stroud. The series includes a character called Ptolemy, from 2nd century BC Ptolemaic Egypt, who is nephew to Ptolemy VIII and cousin to Ptolemy IX
Ptolemaic Terrascope is a magazine founded in 1989. The name was inspired by "Ptolemy the turtle, who lives at Terrascope Towers". Various artworks and logos feature an astronomer peering through a 'terrascope', so Ptolemaic may here refer to Claudius Ptolemaeus
The Last Days of Ptolemy Grey is a novel by Walter Mosley, later adapted into a miniseries of the same name, whose titular character is a lonely 93-year-old man with dementia.

See also
Ptolemy (disambiguation)
Ptolemaeus (disambiguation)
Tolomeo (disambiguation)

References 

Etymologies
Ancient Greece

Cultural history
Hellenistic Egyptians